David Herity (born 12 April 1983) is an Irish hurling manager and former hurler and Gaelic footballer. He is the manager of the Kildare senior hurling team. Herity played for Kilkenny Championship club Dunnamaggin and was a member of the Kilkenny senior hurling team for eight seasons, during which time he lined out as a goalkeeper.

Herity began his hurling career at club level with Dunnamaggin. He broke onto the club's top adult team as a 17-year-old in 2000 and enjoyed his greatest success that year when the club won the Kilkenny Intermediate Championship title. Herity also played Gaelic football with the Kilmoganny club.

At inter-county level, Herity was part of the successful Kilkenny minor team that won Leinster Championship titles in 1999 and 2001 before later winning back-to-back All-Ireland Championships with the under-21 team in 2003 and 2004. He joined the Kilkenny senior team in 2003. Herity subsequently established himself as the team's first-choice goalkeeper and made a combined total of 30 National League and Championship appearances in a career that ended with his last game in 2014. During that time he was part of five All-Ireland Championship-winning teams – in 2008, 2009, 2011, 2012 and 2014. Herity also secured five Leinster Championship medals and five National Hurling League medals. He announced his retirement from inter-county hurling on 24 November 2014.

He is currently manager of the Kildare hurling team.

Playing career

Club

Herity plays his club hurling with the local Dunnamaggin club. He has enjoyed little success apart from a Leinster senior club league title in 2009.

Minor and under-21

Herity first played for Kilkenny in 1999 when he joined the minor side. He won his first Leinster medal that year following a 2–13 to 1–11 defeat of Wexford.

Two years later Herity was still eligible for the minor grade. He collected a second Leinster medal that year following a 3–16 to 1–9 trouncing of Wexford once again.

By 2003 Herity was a key member of the Kilkenny under-21 team. He won his first Leinster medal that year following a 0–12 to 1–4 defeat of Dublin. Kilkenny later faced Galway in the All-Ireland decider. "The Cats" outsmarted a Galway side which struggled in attack and conceded a goal a minute into the second half. The 2–13 to 0–12 score line gave Herity his first All-Ireland medal in the grade.

Herity collected a second Leinster medal in 2004, as Wexford were downed once again by 0–16 to 2–3. The subsequent All-Ireland final between Kilkenny and old rivals Tipperary was a total mismatch. "The Cats" scored key goals early in the opening half, which helped power them to a 3–21 to 1–6 victory.

Senior

While still a member of the under-21 team in 2003, Herity joined the senior team as a member of the extended league panel. He won a National Hurling League medal as a non-playing substitute that year following Kilkenny's remarkable 5–14 to 5–13 extra-time defeat of Tipperary.

After a number of years off the team, Herity returned as third-choice goalkeeper once again in 2008. He won a set of Leinster and All-Ireland medals as a non-playing substitute that year, before collecting another set the following year. Herity added a third Leinster medal to his collection in 2010, once again collected as an unused member of the substitutes.

In 2011 Herity took over from P. J. Ryan as Kilkenny's first-choice goalkeeper for the championship campaign. A 4–17 to 1–15 defeat of Dublin gave "the Cats" a record-equalling seventh successive championship. It was Herity's first winners' medal on the field of play. Kilkenny subsequently faced Tipperary in the All-Ireland decider on 4 September 2011. Goals by Michael Fennelly and Richie Hogan in either half gave Kilkenny, who many viewed as the underdogs going into the game, a 2–17 to 1–16 victory. Herity collected his first All-Ireland medal as a full member of the team.

2012 began well for Herity when he collected a second National League medal on the field of play following a 3–21 to 0–16 demolition of old rivals Cork. Kilkenny were later shocked by Galway in the Leinster decider, losing by 2–21 to 2–11, however, both sides subsequently met in the All-Ireland decider on 9 September 2012. Kilkenny had led going into the final stretch, however, Joe Canning struck a stoppage time equaliser to level the game at 2–13 to 0–19 and send the final to a replay for the first time since 1959. The replay took place three weeks later on 30 September 2012.  Galway stunned the reigning champions with two first-half goals, however, Kilkenny's championship debutant Walter Walsh gave a man of the match performance, claiming a 1–3 haul. The 3–22 to 3–11 Kilkenny victory gave Herity a second All-Ireland medal.

After impressing as a goalkeeper during several games in the 2013 league campaign, Eoin Murphy succeeded in supplanting Herity as first-choice goalkeeper.

Herity was confined to the substitutes' bench once again in 2014, however, an elbow injury to Eoin Murphy saw Herity being restored as first-choice 'keeper for the latter stages of the provincial championship. He subsequently secured a second Leinster medal, as a dominant Kilkenny display gave "the Cats" a 0–14 to 1–9 victory over Dublin. Herity made way for Murphy during the subsequent All-Ireland final and replay, however, he collected a fifth All-Ireland medal overall, his third as a non-playing substitute, following a 2–17 to 2–14 defeat of Tipperary in the decider.

Inter-provincial

Herity has also had the honour of lining out for Leinster in the Interprovincial Championship. He secured a winners' medal in this competition in 2012 following a 2–19 to 1–15 defeat of Connacht.

Manager
Herity became manager of the Kildare hurling team in 2018. They won the 2020 Christy Ring Cup under his leadership.

Career statistics

Inter-county

Honours

As player
Kilkenny
All-Ireland Senior Hurling Championship (5): 2008 (sub), 2009 (sub), 2011, 2012, 2014 (sub)
Leinster Senior Hurling Championship (5): 2008 (sub), 2009 (sub), 2010 (sub), 2011, 2014
National Hurling League (5): 2003 (sub), 2009 (sub), 2012, 2013 (sub), 2014 (sub)
All-Ireland Under-21 Hurling Championship (2): 2003, 2004
Leinster Under-21 Hurling Championship (2): 2003, 2004
Leinster Minor Hurling Championship (2): 1999, 2001

Leinster
Railway Cup (1): 2012

As manager
Kildare
Christy Ring Cup (1): 2020

References

External links
David Herity profile at the Kilkenny GAA website

1983 births
Living people
Dual players
Kilmoganny Gaelic footballers
Dunnamaggin hurlers
Kilkenny inter-county hurlers
Kilkenny inter-county Gaelic footballers
Leinster inter-provincial hurlers
Hurling goalkeepers
Irish schoolteachers
All-Ireland Senior Hurling Championship winners